Suchinda Kraprayoon (born 6 August 1933) is a Thai retired army general and politician. As the commander-in-chief of the Royal Thai Army (1990–1992) he led the 1991 Thai coup d'état in February and was a member of the junta called "National Peace Keeping Council". A year after the coup, on 7 April 1992 he was appointed Prime Minister of Thailand. This sparked mass protests that were violently suppressed during Black May which finally led to his resignation on 24 May 1992.

Early life and education
Suchinda, son of Juang and Sompong Kraprayoon, was born on 6 August 1933, in Thonburi, Siam, and is of mixed Chinese and Mon descent.

Suchinda first attended Wat Rajabopit School and later Amnuayslip School. He studied medicine at Chulalongkorn University in Bangkok for 12 months before entering the Chulachomklao Royal Military Academy. He graduated from Class 5 of the Academy, of which many students would join the National Peace Keeping Council.  He also attended the US Army Command and General Staff Course at the Artillery Regiment, Fort Sill, Oklahoma, and the US Army Command and General Staff Course at Fort Leavenworth, Kansas.

Military career
Suchinda returned to Thailand in 1953 to serve as a Second Lieutenant in the Royal Thai Army. On 25 January 1958 he became Troop Leader in an artillery infantry regiment. He was gradually promoted and given more responsibilities including:
 Lecturer at Army Command and General Staff College
 Director-General of Operations Department
 Assisting Chief of Staff (Army Operations) of the Royal Thai Army
 Deputy Chief of Staff of the Royal Thai Army
 Sub-Commander of the Royal Thai Army
 Commander-in-Chief of the Royal Thai Army (29 April 1990)
 Commander-in-Chief of the Supreme Command Headquarters (1 October 1991)

Coup, NPKC and premiership
Suchinda was a leader of the National Peace Keeping Council (NPKC), which conducted the 1991 Thai coup d'état that ousted the elected government of Prime Minister Chatichai Choonhavan on 23 February 1991. The NPKC installed former diplomat Anand Panyarachun as Prime Minister.

After the general election on 22 March 1992, five parties (Rassadorn, Justice Unity, Social Action, Thai Citizen, Chart Thai) designated Suchinda as the prime minister.  His appointment as Prime Minister on 7 April 1992 resulted in large protests, culminating in a general curfew and military deployment in Bangkok. In the event known as Black May, hundreds of people are believed to have died when soldiers opened fire on unarmed students and demonstrators during the protests. Further escalation was avoided by the intervention of King Bhumibol.

Suchinda resigned from the Premiership on 24 May 1992. The Deputy Prime Minister, Meechai Ruchuphan, became caretaker Prime Minister for an interim period until the new government was assigned. He was succeeded by Anand Panyarachun.

Post-downfall
After resigning, General Suchinda was appointed Chairman of Telecom Holdings, the holding company of Telecom Asia.  Telecom Asia was awarded an unprecedented concession to build 2 million telephone lines in Bangkok after the NPKC seized power.

Personal life
Suchinda is married to Khunying Wannee Kraprayoon (née Noonpakdee), sister of Isarapong Noonpakdee, Suchinda's classmate from military academy. The couple has two sons: Jerdwut Kraprayoon, currently an advisor to the Royal Thai Army and Janewit “Jack” Kraprayoon.

Honours
 1989 -  Knight Grand Cordon of the Most Exalted Order of the White Elephant 
 1988 -  Knight Grand Cordon of the Most Noble Order of the Crown of Thailand
 1992 -  Knight Grand Commander of the Most Illustrious Order of Chula Chom Klao
 1973 -  Victory Medal - Vietnam War, with flames
 1988 -  Freeman Safeguarding Medal - 1st Class 
 1970 -  Border Service Medal 
 1968 -  Chakra Mala Medal 
 1989 -  First Class of Boy Scout Citation Medal of Vajira
 1991 -  King Rama IX Royal Cypher Medal 3rd Class

Military rank
 General, Admiral and Air Chief Marshal

Volunteer Defense Corps of Thailand rank
 Volunteer Defense Corps Colonel

References

1933 births
Living people
Suchinda Kraprayoon
Suchinda Kraprayoon
Suchinda Kraprayoon
Suchinda Kraprayoon
Suchinda Kraprayoon
Suchinda Kraprayoon
Suchinda Kraprayoon
Suchinda Kraprayoon
Suchinda Kraprayoon
Suchinda Kraprayoon
Suchinda Kraprayoon
Leaders who took power by coup
Suchinda Kraprayoon
Suchinda Kraprayoon
Suchinda Kraprayoon
Suchinda Kraprayoon
Suchinda Kraprayoon
Non-U.S. alumni of the Command and General Staff College